This page describes the qualification procedure for 1996 FIBA Europe Under-20 Championship.

Qualified teams
Qualified as the host nation:
 

Qualified as the top teams in the previous tournament:
 
 
 

Qualified through the Qualifying Round

Qualification format
The Qualifying Round was held from 24 July to 30 July 1995. There were four groups, one group of six teams and three groups of seven teams. The first and second placed team from each group qualified for 1996 FIBA Europe Under-20 Championship. One team of each group hosted the mini-tournament.

Qualifying round

Group A
All the games were played in Tallinn, Estonia.

Group B
All the games were played in Funchal, Portugal.

Group C
All the games were played in Constanța, Romania.

Group D
All the games were played in Yambol, Bulgaria.

References
FIBA Archive
FIBA Europe Archive

FIBA Europe Under-20 Championship qualification
1995–96 in European basketball
1996 FIBA Europe Under-20 Championship